Chhun Sothearath (born 2 February 1990 in Phnom Penh, Cambodia) is Cambodian footballer who plays for home town club Boeung Ket Angkor in Cambodian League. He was called to Cambodia national football team at 2014 FIFA World Cup qualification.

Honours

Club
Boeung Ket Angkor
 Cambodian League: 2016:2017
 2015 Mekong Club Championship: Runner up

References

External links
 

1990 births
Living people
Cambodian footballers
Cambodia international footballers
Boeung Ket Rubber Field players
Sportspeople from Phnom Penh
Association football midfielders